Arthur Davis Shores (September 25, 1904 – December 16, 1996) was an American civil rights attorney who was considered Alabama's "drum major for justice".

Education
Shores graduated from Talladega College where he became a member of Alpha Phi Alpha fraternity. He attended only one year of law school at the University of Kansas and then pursued his law studies through La Salle Extension University’s correspondence school.

Legal career

Shores passed the Alabama State Bar exam in 1937 and immediately began using his legal skills to support civil rights issues.
In 1938, Shores successfully sued on behalf of seven school teachers who were denied the right to vote by the Alabama Board of Registrars.

Shores was general counsel for the International Association of Railway Employees (IARE). 
In 1941 he took on the case of Steele v. Louisville & N. R. Co. in which B. W. Steele, a member of the IARE executive, argued that an agreement between the railway and the Brotherhood of Locomotive Firemen and Enginemen was illegal. A whites-only railroad union could not exclude blacks and then deny them better jobs because they were not union members. He worked on this case with attorney Charles H. Houston, who argued it successfully in front of the Supreme Court of the United States in 1944.
Shores represented black teachers in the Jefferson County School Board to receive the same pay as white teachers.

In 1955, Shores successfully argued before the U.S. Supreme Court in Lucy v. Adams to prevent the University of Alabama from denying admission solely based on race or color.  Autherine Lucy became the first African-American to attend the school when she was admitted in 1956. On the third day of classes, a hostile mob assembled to prevent Lucy from attending classes. The police were called to secure her admission but, that evening, the University suspended Lucy on the grounds that it could not provide a safe environment.

Shores' campaign in 1963 to integrate the Birmingham public schools brought violence to him and other residents. Shores' home was fire-bombed on August 20 and September 4 in retaliation for black parents registering their children at white schools.  The bombings—and demonstrations outside Birmingham schools—were used by Gov. George Wallace as a pretext to close the schools in defiance of the federal court desegregation order and to deploy state troopers in the city. Eleven days later a bomb killed four girls at 16th Street Baptist Church. He argued before the Supreme Court in the same year that the arrests of peaceful demonstrators in Birmingham should be ruled unconstitutional.

During the 1960s, he became the first black member of the Birmingham City Council.

In 1977, the NAACP honored Shores by awarding him the William Robert Ming Advocacy Award for the spirit of financial and personal sacrifice displayed in his legal work.

Death
Shores died in December 1996 at his home in Birmingham, Alabama. He was 92.

Citations

External links
 Biography–Arthur Davis Shores (1904-1996)
 Oral History Interview with Arthur Shores from Oral Histories of the American South
 Oral History Interview (November 1985) unedited video of the interview done for the 1987 broadcast of Eyes on the Prize
 Oral History Interview with Arthur Shores, 1984 from Working Lives Oral History Project

1904 births
1996 deaths
University of Kansas alumni
NAACP activists
African-American lawyers
Alabama lawyers
Talladega College alumni
American civil rights lawyers
Lawyers from Birmingham, Alabama
20th-century American lawyers
Activists from Birmingham, Alabama
20th-century African-American people